Torigoe Hachiman Shrine (鳥越八幡神社, Torigoe Hachiman jinja, also called 鳥越八幡宮, Torigoe Hachimangū) is a Shinto shrine located in Shinjō, Yamagata Prefecture, Japan. It is a Hachiman shrine, dedicated to the kami Hachiman. The shrine was founded in 1229, and its annual festival is on August 15.

See also
List of Shinto shrines in Japan
Hachiman shrine

Hachiman shrines
Shinto shrines in Yamagata Prefecture